Jacob Ramm  (18 November 1890 – 31 October 1982) was a Norwegian dentist and organizational leader.

He was born in Kristiania to wholesaler Herman Ramson and Klara Schattenstein.
He graduated as dentist in 1914, and practiced as dentist in Kristiania (later Oslo) as well as a period in Rjukan.

He was appointed secretary and eventually secretary general for the dentists' trade union, .

He was an active bandy and football player, and served as president of both the Norway's Bandy Association and the Football Association of Norway. He was decorated Knight, First Class of the Order of St. Olav in 1951.

Selected works
Den norske tannlægeforening gjennom 75 år
 Skandinavisk Tannlegeforening gjennom 100 år

References

1890 births
1982 deaths
People from Oslo in health professions
Norwegian dentists
Norwegian people of Jewish descent
Norwegian sports executives and administrators
20th-century dentists
Trade unionists from Oslo